Theobald Böhm (or Boehm) (9 April 1794 – 25 November 1881) was a German inventor and musician, who perfected the modern Western concert flute and improved its fingering system (now known as the "Boehm system"). He was a Bavarian court musician, a virtuoso flautist and a renowned composer.

The fingering system he devised has also been adapted to other instruments, such as the oboe and the clarinet.

Life and works 

Born in Munich in Bavaria in the family of goldsmith Carl Friedrich Böhm and Anna Franziska, née Sulzbacher, daughter of a court haberdasher. Boehm learned his father's trade of goldsmithing. After making his own flute, he quickly became proficient enough to play in an orchestra at the age of seventeen, and at twenty-one he was first flautist in the Royal Bavarian Orchestra. Meanwhile, he experimented with constructing flutes out of many different materials—tropical hardwoods (usually Grenadilla wood), silver, gold, nickel and copper—and with changing the positions of the flute's tone holes.

After studying acoustics at the University of Munich, he began experimenting on improving the flute in 1832, first patenting his new fingering system in 1847. He published Über den Flötenbau ("On the construction of flutes"), also in 1847. His new flute was first displayed in 1851 at the London Exhibition. In 1871 Boehm published Die Flöte und das Flötenspiel ("The Flute and Flute-Playing"), a treatise on the acoustical, technical and artistic characteristics of the Boehm system flute.

Boehm's experience as a goldsmith was a key factor in his ability to redesign the flute.  For example, in The Flute and Flute-Playing he recounts having made a flute with moveable tone holes, in order to determine the proper location of each hole for correct intonation—a remarkable piece of metal-working.

Traditional flutes were limited in size because the player had to be able to reach all the tone holes in the span of two hands.  By substituting mechanically covered tone holes, Boehm eliminated this limitation, and was able to make larger, deeper flutes, such as the alto flute.  Boehm was very fond of the alto flute, and recounts a time he was playing it when someone mistook it for a french horn.

Legacy 

Some of the flutes he made are still being played. The fingering system he devised has also been adapted to other instruments, such as the oboe and the clarinet.

He inspired Hyacinthe Klosé, the inventor of the modern clarinet fingering system. Klosé invented a system for the clarinet that today is the standard nearly worldwide (except Austria, Germany and others). Boehm was his inspiration, and so Klosé named the new system the Boehm system just like the modern western flute. The Boehm system clarinet and flute are not exactly the same. If one plays the clarinet with the register key on, the fingerings are the same as the flute when the flute is in the lower and middle register. The main differences between the fingering systems of Boehm system clarinets and flutes are overblowing and key. The clarinet's second register is a twelfth above its lowest register, unlike the flute's which is an octave higher. The B clarinet is a transposing instrument, so a C on a clarinet is played as a B on the flute.

Selected works 

 Grand Polonaise in D Major, Op. 16
 Variations sur un air tyrolien, Op.20
 Fantasie sur un air de F. Schubert, Op.21
 Variations sur un Air Allemand, Op.22
 24 Caprices-etudes, Op.26
 Souvenir des Alpes, Opp.27–32
 Andante for Flute and Piano, Op.33
 24 Etudes, Op.37
 Elégie, Op.47

See also 

 Friedrich Dülon
 Justus Johannes Heinrich Ribock

References

External links 

 
 Alto flute, Boehm and Mendler, Munich, ca. 1880 at The Metropolitan Museum of Art
 The Flute and Flute-Playing in Acoustical, Technical, and Artistic Aspects The Flute and Flute-Playing in Acoustical, Technical, and Artistic Aspects (Kindle Edition)
 On the construction of flutes
 

1794 births
1881 deaths
German classical flautists
German Romantic composers
19th-century German inventors
Flute makers
German musical instrument makers
19th-century classical composers
German male classical composers
19th-century German composers
19th-century German male musicians
20th-century flautists